Wyoming Highway 24 (WYO 24), also known as the Bear Lodge Highway, is a  state highway in Crook County, Wyoming, United States. that connects U.S. Route 14 (US 14) in Carlile Junction with South Dakota Highway 34 (SD 34) at the South Dakota state line. The route passes through the northern portion of the Bear Lodge Mountains, part of the Black Hills National Forest. The highway also passes by Devils Tower National Monument.



Route description

WYO 24 is begins at US 14 in Carlile Junction (also known as Devils Tower Junction). From its western terminus, it travels in a north–south direction, although the route is signed east–west. It is mainly a two-lane highway from US 14 to near Devils Tower National Monument. When it gets to Devils Tower, it spawns a short spur, Wyoming Highway 110 (WYO 110). After passing by WYO 110, it curves northeast-southwest. The road reaches Hulett, where it intersects Wyoming Highway 112. In Hulett, WYO 24 is dubbed Main Street and A Street. Moving on, WYO 24 curves to the signed east–west orientation, but curves northwest-southeast. WYO 24 passes by some gulches, most notably Reservoir Gulch and Lucky Gulch. WYO 24 then turns south, then generally follows the east–west orientation. It then intersects Wyoming Highway 111 a short time later. There are no further major junctions and towns on the route, as WYO 24 crosses the state line and becomes SD 34.

History

WYO 24 was not in the original State Highway grid until 1961. The predecessor to this route was Wyoming Highway 514.

Major intersections

See also

 List of state highways in Wyoming

References

External links

 Wyoming Routes 000-099
 WYO 24 - SD-34/South Dakota State Line to WYO 111
 WYO 24 - WYO 111 to WYO 112
 WYO 24 - WYO 112 to WYO 110
 WYO 24 - WYO 110 to US 14

024
Black Hills
Transportation in Crook County, Wyoming